Everyday or Every Day may refer to:

Books 
 Every Day (novel), by David Levithan, 2012

Film 
 Every Day (2010 film), an American comedy-drama starring Liev Schreiber and Helen Hunt
 Everyday (film), a 2012 British drama directed by Michael Winterbottom
  Every Day (2018 film), an American romantic drama based on the book of the same name
 Everyday (video), a viral video produced by American photographer Noah Kalina

Music

Albums
 Every Day (album), by the Cinematic Orchestra, 2002
 Everyday (Dave Matthews Band album), 2001
 Everyday (Hillsong United album) or the title song, 1999
 Everyday (Widespread Panic album), 1993
 Everyday (Winner album), 2018
 Everyday, an album by Activ, 2007
 Everyday, an EP by Girl's Day, 2010

Songs 
 "Everyday" (Angie Stone song), 2000
 "Everyday" (Ariana Grande song), 2017
 "Everyday" (ASAP Rocky song), 2015
 "Everyday" (Bon Jovi song), 2002
 "Everyday" (Buddy Holly song), 1957
 "Everyday" (Dave Matthews Band song), 2001
 "Everyday" (DJ Méndez song), 2018
 "Every Day" (Eric Prydz song), 2012
 "Everyday" (Logic and Marshmello song), 2018
 "Everyday" (The Oak Ridge Boys song), 1984
 "Everyday" (Orchestral Manoeuvres in the Dark song), 1993
 "Everyday" (Phil Collins song), 1993
 "Every Day" (Rascal Flatts song), 2007
 "Everyday" (Slade song), 1974
 "Every Day" (Stevie Nicks song), 2001
 "Everyday" (Toby Lightman song), 2004
 "Every Day (I Love You More)", by Jason Donovan, 1989
 "Everyday (Rudebwoy)", by Kardinal Offishall, 2005
 "Everyday", by 54-40 from Show Me
 "Every Day", by AFX from Hangable Auto Bulb
 "Everyday", by Agnelli & Nelson
 "Everyday", by Alexia from The Party
 "Everyday", by The Americanos
 "Everyday", by Anne Murray from Yes I Do
 "Everyday", by Anticappella
 "Everyday", by b4-4 from b4-4
 "Everyday", by Ben E. King from Music Trance
 "Everyday", by Bif Naked from Superbeautifulmonster
 "Everyday", by BoDeans from Still
 "Everyday", by Cheryl Lynn from Start Over
 "Everyday", by Def Leppard from X
 "Everyday", by Don McLean from And I Love You So
 "Everyday", by En Vogue from Soul Flower
 "Everyday", by Five from Invincible
 "Everyday", by Hussein Fatale from In the Line of Fire
 "Everyday", by Ivy from Realistic
 "Everyday", by Jimmy Gilmer from Buddy's Buddy
 "Everyday", by Joy Williams from By Surprise
 "Everyday", by Julian Lennon from The Secret Value of Daydreaming
 "Everyday", by Kim English from My Destiny
 "Everyday", by Lisa Loeb from Hello Lisa
 "Everyday", by Orianthi from Violet Journey
 "Everyday", by Ringo Starr from Vertical Man
 "Every Day", by Roxette from The Ballad Hits
 "Everyday", by Scatman John from Take Your Time
 "Every Day", by Shelton Brooks
 "Every Day", by Sick Puppies from Welcome to the Real World
 "Every Day", by Wally Lewis
 "Everyday", by Whiteout from Bite It
 "Everyday", by Z-Ro from The Life of Joseph W. McVey
 "Everyday", from the High School Musical 2 soundtrack
 "Everyday (Coolin')", by Swizz Beatz from Haute Living
 "Everyday (Late November)", by Social Code from Social-Code

See also